= San Pascual, Spain =

Village in Castile and Leon, Spain

Coordinates: 40°53′N 4°45′W

San Pascual is a village in the province of Ávila, within the autonomous community of Castile and León, Spain. The municipality covers an area of 18.61 square kilometres (7.19 sq mi) and, as of 2011, had a population of 48.
